Amir Khayrbak Funerary Complex, Mosque-Madrasa of Al-Amir Khair Bak or Khayrbak Mosque is a religious complex at Bab al-Wazir street (Darb al-Ahmar district), Islamic Cairo, Egypt.  It originally consisted of a mausoleum established by the Ottoman governor of Egypt Khayr Bak in 1502 CE. Later he added a madrasa and a mosque, and annexed the adjacent Amir Alin Aq Palace (built in 1293) which was used by him as residence. On the surrounding area, there is Citadel of Cairo located on the southeast, Amir Alin Aq Palace on the southwest, Aqsunqur Mosque on the northeast side. It is one of many Circassian (Burji) style Mamluk architectures built during the Middle Ages.

Architecture

On the exterior there is a domed roof with floral motifs, an arched entrance covered with muqarnas, a pathway that leads to north end of the complex, and a minaret which lost its peak at the earthquake of 1884, but was reconstructed in 2003.

As for the interior, it is rectangular shaped and there is an incised bowl with four ribs, and it is surrounded by four iwans. The eastern and western iwans are deeper than the iwan with qibla which occupies the southern side of the building and the northern iwan on the opposite side, due to the building being rectangular. The walls of the iwans are surrounded by 1.5 meters marble mantle above the madrasa floor, topped with a strip inscribed with verses from Surah al-Fath. The mihrab is in the middle of the southern wall and is surrounded by two smaller rings. These three girders occupy the whole area of the southern iwan.

See also
  Lists of mosques 
  List of mosques in Africa
  List of mosques in Egypt

References

External links
 Government Website of Islamic artifacts

16th-century mosques
Buildings and structures completed in 1502
Buildings and structures in Cairo
Mamluk architecture in Egypt
Islamic architecture
Mosque buildings with domes
Mausoleums in Egypt
Establishments in the Mamluk Sultanate
Mosques in Cairo
Tourist attractions in Egypt